Waegwan is the seat of government for Chilgok County, North Gyeongsang province, South Korea. It consists primarily of the administrative district of Waegwan-eup. It is situated on both sides of the Nakdong River, which is traversed by railroad, automobile and pedestrian bridges.

Waegwan is home to a Benedictine monastery and the United States Army base at Camp Carroll. It lies on the Gyeongbu Line of the Korean National Railroad, and is also connected to Daegu and other major cities via the Gyeongbu Expressway.

History
Waegwan's name literally means "Japanese dwelling," and may indicate that the town was a common stopping-point for Japanese salt traders during the Joseon Dynasty.

In the summer of 1939, Korean and Japanese students from the Daegu Normal School (now the teachers' college of Kyungpook National University) were sent to Waegwan to do forced labor on the Gyeongbu Line railroad tracks. A demonstration, known as the Waegwan Incident (왜관사건) took place on July 26, in which Korean students protested preferential treatment given to Japanese students. In consequence, seven of the students were expelled.

Korean War 
During the early phase of the Korean War in August and September 1950, the area around Waegwan was the site of intense fighting as North Korean forces pushed south toward Daegu. Monuments to the UN and South Korean forces now stand on the low mountain overlooking the northeastern section of the city, which is locally known as "Jagosan" and known in military reports as Hill 303.

In an attempt to slow the Northern advance, on August 3 American forces blew up the bridge at Waegwan while hundreds of refugees were crossing. This took place under the orders of Major General Hobart R. Gay and Lieutenant General Dell Plunkett. They believed that the refugees were North Korean soldiers in disguise. In the 1990s, the halves of the bridge were reconnected to serve as a pedestrian crossing between the two halves of Waegwan.

This was not the only atrocity committed in the area. On August 27, 1950, the retreating North Korean forces who had gained control of the area shot more than forty American POWs on Hill 303. Of these, five survived.

Notable landmarks
Hill 303 memorial
Waegwan Abbey

See also
List of cities in South Korea

Notes
 
 
 
 

External links

Towns and townships in North Gyeongsang Province
Chilgok County